Henry Messmer (August 25, 1839–February 20, 1899) was a Swiss-American architect who practiced in Milwaukee, Wisconsin from 1866 until his death. He was a prolific designer of institutional buildings as well as homes on Milwaukee's near north and east sides.

Career
Born in Switzerland, Messmer studied architecture at Heidelberg University and apprenticed in Europe before coming to Wisconsin in 1866. He worked as a draftsman in the offices of Leonard Schmidtner of Milwaukee and Col. Shipman of Madison before establishing his own architectural firm in Milwaukee in 1873. 

Messmer designed hundreds of brewery buildings, warehouses, and commercial buildings as well as middle-class homes over the next two decades, as well as a number of churches and schools. Prominent works include the churches of St. Hedwig's (1886), St. Hyacinth (1882), and Saints Peter and Paul (1890) in Milwaukee, St. Mary's in Port Washington (1881), and the rectory of St. Casimir's in Milwaukee.

His son Robert A. Messmer joined the firm not long after graduating from East Division High School in 1887, after which the firm was renamed H. Messmer & Son. After Henry Messmer's death in 1899, Robert Messmer continued the firm under this name, later joined by his younger brother Henry J. Messmer, until about 1910, when it continued under the name R.A. Messmer & Brother.

References

19th-century American architects
Architects from Milwaukee
Swiss emigrants to the United States
1839 births
1899 deaths